Andrew Hessel is a micro-biologist and geneticist and entrepreneur. He founded the Pink Army Cooperative, and Humane Genomics, Inc. Between 2012-2017, he was a Distinguished Researcher at  Autodesk Life Sciences. Hessel is co-chair of Bioinformatics and Biotechnology at Singularity University, and a fellow at the Institute for Science, Society, and Policy at the University of Ottawa. In 2002, he co-founded Miikana Therapeutics, a clinical-stage drug development company. The company was acquired by Entremed in 2006 for $39M in cash and milestones.
He received a M.Sc. in biology from University of Calgary 1993-1995 and was Research Operations Manager at Amgen Institute 1995-2002. He has also been involved in Genome Project-Write since the start in 2016 and is currently Chairman of the Board and Co-Executive Director.

References

External links
 Autodesk Life Sciences
 Pink Army Cooperative

Year of birth missing (living people)
Living people
American geneticists
American technology chief executives
American technology company founders
Biotechnologists
Synthetic biologists